Paris Saint-Germain Football Club holds many records, most notably being the most successful French club in history in terms of official titles won, with 47. They are the record holders of all national competitions, having clinched ten Ligue 1 championships, fourteen Coupe de France, nine Coupe de la Ligue, and eleven Trophée des Champions. Their trophy cabinet also includes one Ligue 2 title. In international football, PSG have claimed one UEFA Cup Winners' Cup and one UEFA Intertoto Cup. Additionally, they have won 25 unofficial titles.

Their victory in the 1995–96 UEFA Cup Winners' Cup makes PSG the sole French side to have won this trophy, one of only two French clubs to have won a major European competition, and the youngest European team to do so. The Parisians are also the club with the most consecutive seasons in the top-flight (48 seasons in Ligue 1 since 1974–75). Furthermore, PSG are the only side to have won the Coupe de France without conceding a single goal (1992–93 and 2016–17), five Coupe de la Ligue in a row (2014–2018), four back-to-back Coupe de France (2015–2018), and eight consecutive Trophée des Champions (2013–2020).

PSG have won all four national titles in a single season on four occasions. This feat is known as the domestic quadruple. The Red and Blues have completed the domestic double, the league and league cup double, the domestic cup double, the domestic treble and the league three-peat several times as well. Therefore, PSG are the club with the most domestic doubles and league and league cup doubles, one of two sides to have achieved the league three-peat twice, and the only team to have won the domestic cup double, the domestic treble and the domestic quadruple.

Influential officials and players in the club's history include most decorated president Nasser Al-Khelaifi, most decorated manager Laurent Blanc, record appearance maker Jean-Marc Pilorget, all-time top scorer Kylian Mbappé, assist maestro Ángel Di María, clean sheet leader Bernard Lama, most capped and longest-serving captain Thiago Silva, Ballon d'Or winner Lionel Messi, and world-record transfer Neymar.

Honours
As of the 2022 Riyadh Season Cup.

Official

 
  shared record

Unofficial

 
  shared record

Achievements

 
  shared record

Competitive record

As of 19 March 2023.

Club

Matches

All-time record win: 10–0 (away to Côte Chaude, Coupe de France, 22 January 1994).
All-time record defeat: 0–6 (away to Nantes, Ligue 1, 1 September 1971).
Record home win in Ligue 1: 9–0 (vs. Guingamp, 19 January 2019).
Record away win in Ligue 1: 9–0 (vs. Troyes, 13 March 2016).
Record home defeat in Ligue 1: 0–4 (vs. Nice, 30 April 1988).
Record away defeat in Ligue 1: 0–6 (vs. Nantes, 1 September 1971).
Record home win in UEFA competitions: 7–1.
(vs. Gent, UEFA Intertoto Cup, 1 August 2001).
(vs. Celtic, UEFA Champions League, 22 November 2017).
Record away win in UEFA competitions: 5–0.
(vs. Anderlecht, UEFA Champions League, 23 October 2013).
(vs. Malmö, UEFA Champions League, 25 November 2015).
(vs. Celtic, UEFA Champions League, 12 September 2017).
(vs. Club Brugge, UEFA Champions League, 22 October 2019).
Record home defeat in UEFA competitions: 1–6 (vs. Juventus, UEFA Super Cup, 15 January 1997).
Record away defeat in UEFA competitions: 1–6 (vs. Barcelona, UEFA Champions League, 8 March 2017).
Record home win in national cups: 7–0 (vs. Bastia, Coupe de France, 7 January 2017).
Record away win in national cups: 10–0 (vs. Côte Chaude, Coupe de France, 22 January 1994).
Record home defeat in national cups: 0–5 (vs. Reims, Coupe de France, 4 May 1974).
Record away defeat in national cups: 0–3 (vs. Sochaux, Coupe de France, 5 April 1988).

Streaks

Longest winning run in all competitions: 16 matches.
Longest winning run in Ligue 1: 14 matches (National Record).
Longest winning run in UEFA competitions: 8 matches.
Longest winning run in national cups: 49 matches (National Record).
Longest unbeaten run in all competitions: 37 matches.
Longest unbeaten run in Ligue 1: 36 matches (National Record).
Longest unbeaten run in UEFA competitions: 19 matches.
Longest unbeaten run in national cups: 49 matches (National Record).

Seasons

Most consecutive seasons played in Ligue 1: 48 as of 2021–22 (National Record).
Most matches played in all competitions: 61 in 1994–95.
Most goals scored in all competitions: 171 in 2017–18 (National Record).
Most goals scored in Ligue 1: 108 in 2017–18.
Most goals scored in UEFA competitions: 27 in 2017–18 UEFA Champions League.
Most wins in all competitions: 47 in 2015–16.
Most points in Ligue 1: 96 in 2015–16 (National Record).
Fewest goals conceded in all competitions: 28 in 1993–94.
Fewest goals conceded in Ligue 1: 19 in 2015–16 (National Record).
Fewest goals conceded in UEFA competitions: 2 in 2002–03 UEFA Cup.

Attendances

All-time highest home attendance: 49,575 (vs. Waterschei, UEFA Cup Winners' Cup, 13 March 1983).
All-time lowest home attendance: 2,006  (vs. Mantes, Ligue 2, 25 April 1974).
Highest home attendance in UEFA competitions: 49,575 (vs. Waterschei, UEFA Cup Winners' Cup, 13 March 1983).
Lowest home attendance in UEFA competitions: 9,117 (vs. Karpaty Lviv, UEFA Europa League, 30 September 2010).
Highest average home attendance: 46,929 in 2017–18.
Lowest average home attendance: 679 in 1972–73.

Personnel

Presidents

All-time most titles won with the club: 29 titles – Nasser Al-Khelaifi.
Most titles won in UEFA competitions: 1 title – Michel Denisot and Laurent Perpère.
Longest-serving: 13 years, 4 months, 23 days – Francis Borelli.

Managers

All-time most titles won with the club: 11 titles – Laurent Blanc.
Most titles won in UEFA competitions: 2 titles – Luis Fernandez.
All-time most matches managed: 244 matches – Luis Fernandez.
Most matches managed in UEFA competitions: 46 matches – Luis Fernandez.
All-time most matches won: 126 wins – Laurent Blanc.
Most matches won in UEFA competitions: 30 wins – Luis Fernandez.
Highest win percentage: 76.32% – Unai Emery.
Longest-serving: 3 years, 7 months – Georges Peyroche.

Players

Appearances

Most titles won with the club: 29 titles – Marco Verratti.
Most Ligue 1 titles won with the club: 8 titles – Marco Verratti (National Record).
Most Trophée des Champions titles won with the club: 9 titles – Marco Verratti (National Record).
Unbeaten player (never lost a match with the club): 26 matches without defeat – Juan Pablo Sorín.
Youngest player to play for the club: 16 years, 4 months and 29 days – Warren Zaïre-Emery.
Oldest player to play for the club: 41 years, 5 months – Gianluigi Buffon.

All-time most appearances

Statistics correct as of 19 March 2023. Bold denotes an active player for the club.

Most appearances in Ligue 1

Statistics correct as of 19 March 2023. Bold denotes an active player for the club.

Most appearances in UEFA competitions

Statistics correct as of 9 March 2023. Bold denotes an active player for the club.

Goalscorers

Youngest player to score for the club: 16 years, 10 months, 25 days – Warren Zaïre-Emery.
Fastest goal in all competitions: 8 seconds – Kylian Mbappé (vs. Lille, Ligue 1, 21 August 2022).
Most goals in a season: 50 – Zlatan Ibrahimović in 2015–16 (National Record).
Most goals in a Ligue 1 season: 38 – Zlatan Ibrahimović in 2015–16.
Most goals in a UEFA competitions season: 10 – Zlatan Ibrahimović in the 2013–14 UEFA Champions League.
Most goals in a match: 5 – Kylian Mbappé (vs. Pays de Cassel, Coupe de France, 23 January 2023).

All-time top scorers

Statistics correct as of 11 March 2023. Bold denotes an active player for the club.

Top scorers in Ligue 1

Statistics correct as of 11 March 2023. Bold denotes an active player for the club.

Top scorers in national cups

Statistics correct as of 23 January 2023. Bold denotes an active player for the club.

Top scorers in UEFA competitions

Statistics correct as of 2 November 2022. Bold denotes an active player for the club.

Hat-tricks in UEFA competitions

Statistics correct as of 16 February 2021.

Assists

Most assists in Ligue 1: 80 – Safet Sušić.
Most assists in a Ligue 1 season: 18 – Ángel Di María in 2015–16 (National Record).
Most assists in a UEFA competitions season: 7 – Zlatan Ibrahimović in the 2012–13 UEFA Champions League.
Most assists in a season (all official competitions): 24 – Safet Sušić in 1984–85 and Ángel Di María in 2015–16.
All-time most assists in a match: 5 – Safet Sušić (vs. Bastia, Ligue 1, 21 September 1984).
Most assists in a Ligue 1 match: 5 – Safet Sušić (vs. Bastia, 21 September 1984).
Most assists in a UEFA competitions match: 4.
Leonardo (vs. Steaua București, UEFA Champions League, 27 August 1997).
Zlatan Ibrahimović (vs. Dinamo Zagreb, UEFA Champions League, 6 November 2012).

All-time most assists

Statistics correct as of 4 March 2023. Bold denotes an active player for the club.

Most assists in UEFA competitions

Statistics correct as of 2 November 2022. Bold denotes an active player for the club.

Decisive actions

All-time most decisive actions

Players with a combined total of more than 100 decisive actions (goals + assists).

Statistics correct as of 11 March 2023. Bold denotes an active player for the club.

Clean sheets

All-time most clean sheets

Statistics correct as of 23 January 2023. Bold denotes an active player for the club.

Most clean sheets in UEFA competitions

Statistics correct as of 15 February 2022. Bold denotes an active player for the club.

Captaincy

Longest-serving captain: 7 years, 10 months, 3 days – Thiago Silva.
Youngest player to captain the club: 17 years, 8 months – Mamadou Sakho.
Youngest player to captain a club in Ligue 1: 17 years, 8 months – Mamadou Sakho.

Captains

All-time most captaincies

Statistics correct as of 9 March 2023. Bold denotes an active player for the club.

Transfers

As of 12 August 2022.

Most expensive arrivals

Most expensive departures

Award winners

France Football

Ballon d'Or (1)
 Lionel Messi –  2021.

Kopa Trophy (1)
 Kylian Mbappé – 2018.

Yashin Trophy (1)
 Gianluigi Donnarumma – 2021.

African Footballer of the Year (1)
 George Weah – 1994.

FIFA

The Best FIFA Men's Player (1)
 Lionel Messi –  2022.

Tuttosport

Golden Boy (1)
 Kylian Mbappé – 2017.

UEFA Champions League

 UEFA Champions League Top Scorer (1)
 George Weah in 1994–95.

 UEFA Champions League Assist Leader (2)
 Zlatan Ibrahimović in 2012–13.
 Ángel Di María in 2019–20.

Trophées UNFP du football

 Ligue 1 Manager of the Season (4)
 Carlo Ancelotti in 2012–13.
 Laurent Blanc (2) in 2014–15, 2015–16.
 Unai Emery in 2017–18.
 Ligue 1 Player of the Season (11)
 David Ginola in 1993–94.
 Vincent Guérin in 1994–95.
 Marco Simone in 1997–98.
 Zlatan Ibrahimović (3) in 2012–13, 2013–14, 2015–16.
 Edinson Cavani in 2016–17.
 Neymar in 2017–18.
 Kylian Mbappé (3) in 2018–19, 2020–21, 2021–22.
 Ligue 1 Goalkeeper of the Season (4)
 Salvatore Sirigu (2) in 2012–13, 2013–14.
 Keylor Navas in 2020–21.
 Gianluigi Donnarumma in 2021–22.
 Ligue 1 Young Player of the Season (4)
 Mamadou Sakho in 2010–11.
 Marco Verratti in 2013–14.
 Kylian Mbappé (2) in 2017–18, 2018–19.
 Ligue 1 Goal of the Season (2)
 Ronaldinho in 2002–03.
 Zlatan Ibrahimović in 2013–14.

Ligue de Football Professionnel

 Ligue 1 Golden Boot (13)
 Carlos Bianchi (2) in 1977–78, 1978–79.
 Pauleta (2) in 2005–06, 2006–07.
 Zlatan Ibrahimović (3) in 2012–13, 2013–14, 2015–16.
 Edinson Cavani (2) in 2016–17, 2017–18.
 Kylian Mbappé (4) in 2018–19, 2019–20, 2020–21, 2021–22.
 Ligue 1 Assist Leader (4)
 Ángel Di María (2) in 2015–16, 2019–20.
 Neymar in 2017–18.
 Kylian Mbappé in 2021–22.

Notes

References

External links

Official websites
PSG.FR - Site officiel du Paris Saint-Germain
Paris Saint-Germain - Ligue 1
Paris Saint-Germain - UEFA.com

Records and Statistics
Paris Saint-Germain F.C.